Maximilian Osinski is an Austrian-born American actor known for his recurring role as Agent Davis on Marvel's Agents of S.H.I.E.L.D..

Biography
Maximilian Osinski was born in Austria, but raised in Chicago before moving to New York City to study acting. Max has acted on film, including Love & Other Drugs and The Express: The Ernie Davis Story. He makes a recurring appearance on Agents of S.H.I.E.L.D. as Agent Davis where his wife Dichen Lachman portrayed the villain in season 2. He co-wrote and co-produced the web series Hollywood Hitmen along with Enver Gjokaj, and starred opposite 'Scream Queen' Jordan Ladd and Australian actor Adam J. Yeend in the hit short film Brentwood Strangler.

Personal life
Osinski has been married to Australian actress Dichen Lachman since January 2015. In May of the same year she gave birth to their daughter.

Filmography

Film

Television

References

External links
 

Austrian emigrants to the United States
American people of Polish descent
American male television actors
Austrian people of Polish descent
Year of birth missing (living people)
Living people